Río Grande District is one of five districts of the province Palpa in Peru. The archaeological site of Pernil Alto is located in the district.

References

1953 establishments in Peru
States and territories established in 1953